The Little 500 (also known popularly as the "Little Five"), is a track cycling race held annually during the third weekend of April at Bill Armstrong Stadium on the campus of Indiana University in Bloomington, Indiana. It is attended by more than 25,000 fans each April.

History
The race was founded in 1951 by Howdy Wilcox Jr., executive director of the Indiana University Foundation, who modeled the race after the Indianapolis 500 automotive race, which his father had won in 1919. Racers compete in teams of four, racing relay-style for 200 laps along a quarter-mile cinder track. Thirty-three teams are selected in qualifications trials to compete in the main race. Money raised by the event funds scholarships for working Indiana University students.

The inaugural Women’s Little 500 was held in 1988. Four members of the Kappa Alpha Theta sorority completed a qualifications run in the 1987 men’s event on their 3rd and final attempt, but failed to qualify into the field of 33. In 1988, the IU Student Foundation launched the Women's Race. Thirty-one teams competed in the first Women's Race which was won by an all-freshman team, Willkie Sprint, representing Willkie Residential Hall. Kappa Alpha Theta has been the most successful Women's Team.

The 2020 Men's and Women's Little 500 races were cancelled due to the Covid-19 pandemic. The race returned in 2021 but no spectators were allowed in the stadium due to Monroe County's and Indiana University's COVID guidelines. Fans were allowed back to Bill Armstrong stadium for the 2022 races.

Events surrounding the race
Billed as "The World's Greatest College Weekend," the race has expanded into a week of activities. The Women's Little 500 (100 laps), first held in 1988, is run each year. Other events such as the Little Fifty Running Relay Race and Alumni Races add to the festivities. During his run for presidency, then-senator Barack Obama made an unannounced visit to the Little 500 women's race in 2008. , the Little 500 has raised a total of more than $2 million in scholarship funds.

Rules

Special rules for the Little 500 race include:
 All riders must use the official Little 500 bike that is provided to them for that year. There can be no toe clips or grips, kick stands, water bottles, air pumps, untaped or unplugged handlebars, or any other add-on accessories.
 For the safety of all riders, hard helmets must be worn and buckled at all times, as well as biking gloves.
 Each team is required to complete 10 exchanges (five for the women) during the course of the race.
 At the 198th lap (98th for the women), all riders not on the lead lap will be asked to move to the back or exit the pack. This is done so that all teams in contention on their last two laps can make their attempt to win the race. Teams which do not comply with this rule are believed to be impeding the progress of another rider and will be given a 5- to 20-second penalty or even disqualification, depending on the severity of the violation.

Little 500 bikes
Little 500 bikes are identical, single-speed (46x18), coaster brake racing bicycles with 700c wheels, 32mm tires and flat rubber pedals. The unusual specification originated with the famous AMF Roadmaster bicycles of the 1960s and 1970s, once the sole bicycle type used in the event. The men's and women's version differs only in frame size. Every year a new version of the specified bicycle type is purchased, with two given to each team. A deposit of $400 must be placed for both bikes. At the end of the season, teams are given the option to keep their race bikes or to return them to IUSF in exchange for their deposit. Returned former race bikes are kept at the track and rented out to teams that lack bicycles meeting Little 500 specifications.

Eligibility
Several criteria must be met by a student who desires to participate as a rider in the Little 500:
 The student must be a full-time undergraduate student enrolled at Indiana University Bloomington Campus during the fall and spring semesters of the year of participation.
 The student must have a cumulative GPA of 2.00 or better.
 The student may only compete up to four times in a five-year period.
 The student must be an amateur.
 No substance abuse of any type is tolerated.
 For a team to be eligible, at least one member must attend all race information meetings and turn in the final four cards with the names of the team's riders for that year.

Following the release of Breaking Away, a real-life Cutters team was formed. Their first race was in 1984, which they won. They are students, who are traditionally either Bloomington locals or at the very least non-Greek, and have been tremendously successful, winning fourteen races that they have entered, while never finishing worse than 12th.

Series events
The Little 500 includes four events beside the race itself: Qualifications, ITTs, Miss-N-Out, and Team Pursuit. These events are collectively known as "The Spring Series". The team that wins The Spring Series is also awarded a white jersey to wear during that year's race. These events also ensure that all the members of a team, not just those competing in the actual race itself, can still participate and compete.

Qualifications
Qualifications, commonly known as "Quals," is the first and one of the most important series events. Qualifications is a four-lap race around the track to see which team can get the fastest cumulative time. These times determine if a team qualifies to race in Little Five and, if so, where in the field of the top 33 teams they will be placed. Teams start the race lined up in 11 rows of three, starting with the pole winner up front on the inside, and teams choose their pits and jerseys in the order in which they qualify, so this is another reason to qualify high. Each team is given three attempts to qualify. The reason for this is in case a team botches an exchange, then they still have two more chances to qualify. The way that a team can botch an exchange is if a member falls and takes the bike down with him, or if the team does not perform the exchange in the given distance, marked by white lines on the track. A team can use as many as four riders or as few as two riders. But whatever number of riders they use to qualify is the fewest riders they can use for Little Five. Meaning that if a team qualifies with four people, then that team must race with four people. But if they qualify using only three people, then they can use three or four people on the day of Little Five. The team that qualifies on the pole is given a green jersey for the race.

Due to the COVID-19 Pandemic, 2021 Qualifications were cancelled. The starting grid was determined by the results of the Team Pursuit Spring Series Event. Qualifications returned in 2022, with Kappa Alpha Theta on pole for the Women's race and Phi Kappa Psi on pole for the Men's Race.

ITTs
Like a qualification, an Individual Time Trial (ITT) is a four-lap (one mile) sprint around the track. But unlike qualifications, it is performed individually. It is a test of both speed and sprint endurance. There are up to four riders on the track at a time. One rider is placed at each turn of the track. The riders line up with the start/finish line that is drawn in white on the track. Then a race official will come behind the rider and hold the bike steady so that the rider can set both feet on the pedals. In recent years, there has been a five-beep countdown, but in 2007 a gun start was used. The riders begin from a dead stop and race around the track. It is possible to catch other riders on the track while racing, but it is important not to draft. A rider caught blatantly drafting off of another rider is automatically disqualified.

ITTs All-Time Record:

Men’s: 2005 Hans Arnesen (Alpha Tau Omega) - 02:15.78

Women’s: 2018 Brooke Hannon (Melanzana) - 02:33.083

ITTs 2022 Winners:

Men's: Jimmy Kulik (Phi Delta Theta) - 2:25:45

Women's: Grace Williams (Melanzana) - 2:51:07

Miss-N-Out
In the Miss-N-Out event, there are heats of 5 to 8 riders, depending on the number of riders signed up for the day. Riders start on a line and are given one lap to get the position they want and to gain some speed. Once they cross the start line again, the race begins. The riders race around the track and every time the pack crosses the start/finish line, the last one to cross is out and must leave the track. Riders keep racing until there are only three riders left. These three riders move on to the next round. This process continues until the final heat of eight. In this heat, riders continue to race and get out until the last three remain and then they commence a one-lap full-out sprint and the first-, second- and third-place winners are determined by the order in which the riders cross the finish line.

2022 Women's Final:

1. Grace Williams (Melanzana)

2. Jordan Ortman (SKI)

3. Abby Hummels (Kappa Alpha Theta)

2022 Men's Final:

1. Jimmy Kulik (Phi Delta Theta)

2. Gavin Goode (Black Key Bulls)

3. Jacob Richards (Gray Goat)

Team Pursuit
In an even geared more towards the team rather than the individual, two teams of four race around the track in a pace line for 15 laps (3.75 mi) for the men and for the women, each team in hot pursuit of the other since they start on opposite ends of the track. One person per team may drop out of the pace line during the race, but three team members must finish. The team's time is the time of the 3rd rider to cross the line. The final heat sees the two fastest teams race head-to-head.

Team Pursuit All-Time Record:

Men’s: 1986 Cutters - 08:38.81

Women’s: 2011 Teter - 07:50.11

Team Pursuit 2022 Winners:

Men's: Phi Kappa Psi

Women's: Kappa Alpha Theta

Fall Series 
Indiana University Student Foundation, as well as Riders Council, a group of students that make up the rules committee for the race, also offer fall events for students to participate in. They also offer skills clinics. Events in the Fall Series include ITTs, Street Sprints, CycloCross and Tuesday Night Race Series. Fall Series results do not count toward Little 500.

Tuesday Night Race Series 
Each night is broken up into three events. Scratch races, in which the men will compete ten laps and the women eight. Points Races, in which points are awarded every five laps of a predetermined overall number of laps. The top four riders on the ‘points lap’ receive points: 5, 3, 2, and 1 for 1st through 4th. The winner is the one with the most points at the end of the race. The men ride twenty laps and the women ride fifteen. The third event consists of Miss-N-Out Heats.

Media coverage
The events of the Little 500 were dramatized in the 1979 Academy Award-winning movie Breaking Away, which depicts a group of Bloomington townies who enter the race as the "Cutters" (from the local Indiana limestone stonecutters) and defeat the favored fraternity teams. Thirty years later, in 2009, Smithville produced a half-hour-long documentary, Ride Fast, Turn Left, that followed four teams preparing for and competing in the race. In February 2015, One Day in April was released which depicts two men's and two women's teams' preparation and dedication preceding the race.

A Bollywood movie Jo Jeeta Wohi Sikandar, based on the Little 500, was made in the year 1992, starring Aamir Khan.

Highlights of the 1981 race were shown on ESPN and the first major coverage was by CBS Sports Saturday for the 1982 race. CBS's auto racing announcer, Ken Squier called the race, with Dave Blase providing color commentary. The races have also been broadcast live on the Indiana University student radio station WIUX and on television since 2002 on AXS.tv (formerly known as HDNet), which is owned by Indiana University alumnus Mark Cuban.

List of winners 

Men's Race 

Women's Race

References

External links
Official website
Indiana University Student Foundation, Indiana University

Cycle races in the United States
Indiana University Bloomington
College sports in Indiana
Recurring sporting events established in 1951
1951 establishments in Indiana
Track cycling races
Bloomington, Indiana
Tourist attractions in Bloomington, Indiana